Proto-Niger–Congo is the hypothetical reconstructed proto-language of the proposed Niger–Congo language family.

Validity
Unlike Nilo-Saharan, the Niger–Congo language phylum is accepted by mainstream linguists and Africanists. Atlantic–Congo (roughly, Niger–Congo but excluding the Mande, Kru, Siamou, Kordofanian, Dogon and Ijoid languages) is accepted by Glottolog 4.4

Origin

Blench (2006, 2016) proposes that Proto-Niger-Congo originated about 11-10,000 years before present in the western part of the "Green Sahara" of Africa (roughly the Sahel and southern Sahara), and that its dispersal can be correlated with the spread of the bow and arrow by migrating hunter-gatherers.

Phonology

Tones
Larry Hyman (2016) reconstructs two contrastive level tones for Proto-Niger–Congo, which are:

 *H (high tone)
 *L (low tone)

Syllabic structure
Proto-Niger–Congo is traditionally assumed to have had a disyllabic root structure similar to that of Proto-Bantu, namely (C)V-CVCV (Williamson 2000, etc.). However, Roger Blench (2016) proposes a trisyllabic (CVCVCV) syllabic structure for Proto-Niger–Congo roots, while Konstantin Pozdniakov (2016) suggests that the main prototypical structure of Proto-Niger–Congo roots is *CVC, along with disyllabic, trisyllabic, and other variations.

Morphology

Noun classes
Noun classes can be reconstructed for Proto-Niger–Congo. Noun class prefixes in Proto-Niger–Congo include:

noun class 1: prefix for human singular
noun class 2: prefix for human plural
noun class 6A: prefix for liquid and mass nouns ("uncountables")

Below are some Niger-Congo noun class markers (Good 2020:145, from Schadeberg 1989:72):

Verbal extensions
Below are some Proto-Niger-Congo, Proto-Bantu, and Proto-Atlantic verbal extensions (Good 2020:146, from Hyman 2007:157):

For example, in Swahili:
verb root: penda 'to love'
reciprocal: pendana 'to love each other'
applicative: pendea 'to love for'
causative: pendeza 'to please'

Pronouns
Güldemann's (2018) Proto-Niger–Congo pronoun reconstructions, for the first and second person pronouns (singular and plural), are given below.

Babaev (2013) is a detailed survey of pronouns in Niger–Congo languages, along with detailed reconstructions.

Numerals
Konstantin Pozdniakov (2018) has published a detailed reconstruction of Proto-Niger–Congo numerals, as well as comprehensive reconstructions for the lower-order branches of the Niger–Congo phylum. Pozdniakov (2018: 293) and Güldemann (2018: 147) reconstruct the following numerals for Proto-Niger–Congo.

The numerals 6-9 are formed by combining lower numerals, while ‘20’ is derived from ‘person’.

Lexicon
There is currently no comprehensive, systematic reconstruction for Proto-Niger–Congo lexical roots. Nevertheless, quasi-reconstructions (preliminary, tentative reconstructions, which are marked using the number sign #) have been attempted by Roger Blench, who is currently compiling a Niger–Congo etymological dictionary. Some examples from Blench (2016):

's reconstruction of Proto-Western Nigritic (roughly equivalent to Proto-Atlantic–Congo) was published in 2 volumes in 1976 and 1977.

Plants
Blench (2009) lists various Niger–Congo quasi-reconstructions for plants with important economic uses (note that not all of them necessarily reconstruct to Proto-Niger–Congo). These roots are generally widespread areal forms (Wanderworts), with some of them also found in Afroasiatic and Nilo-Saharan languages. A few forms are also added from some of Blench's other works (2006, 2012, 2016).

Other plant names with widespread areal distributions in West Africa:
Milicia excelsa: odum, iroko (in Ghana and Nigeria)
Funtumia elastica (bush rubber tree): o-fruntum (in Ghana)
Sesamum indicum (sesame): #-sVwa (Benue-Congo)
Abelmoschus esculentus (okra): ɔ́kʊrʊ, ɪkɪabʊ, akɛnɛta (in southern Nigeria)

Animals
Below are some quasi-reconstructions of Niger–Congo areal forms for animal names given by Blench (2007), with some reconstructions also based on Blench (2006).

See also
Proto-Bantu language
Proto-Afroasiatic language
Haplogroup E-M2

Bibliography

Grollemund, Rebecca, Simon Branford, Jean-Marie Hombert & Mark Pagel. 2016. Genetic unity of the Niger-Congo family. Paper presented for the 2nd International Congress "Towards Proto-Niger-Congo: Comparison and Reconstruction", Paris, 1-3 September, 2016.

References

External links
Towards Proto-Niger-Congo: Comparison and Reconstruction
Niger-Congo Reconstruction project at LLACAN

Niger-Congo
Niger–Congo languages